Seigi Nakamura (仲村正義, Nakamura Seigi, 1924-1999) was an Okinawan martial arts master who learned both the Shōrin-ryū and Gōjū-ryū styles of karate.

Karate-do

Nakamura practiced with Shoshin Nagamine and was also influenced by Shinyei Kyan and Jokei Kushi who were both senior students in Nagamine's dojo. For a number of years, Nakamura was the senior instructor at Nagamine's honbu dojo in Naha, Okinawa.

Legacy

Nakamura profoundly influenced and inspired what is taught in Shōrin-ryū Kishaba Juku and developed and founded by his students Chokei Kishaba and Katsuhiko Shinzato.

See also 

Okinawan martial arts

References

External links 
 Katsuhiko Shinzato on Okinawa BBTV
 [ Okinawan Shorin-ryu karate - Midwest Honbu Dojo ] Facebook Page

Okinawan male karateka
1924 births
1999 deaths
Shōrin-ryū practitioners